The Hawaii Consolidated Railway (HCR), originally named the Hilo Railroad Company, was a standard gauge common carrier railroad that served much of the east coast of the island of Hawaii (The Big Island) from 1899 until 1946, when a tsunami destroyed part of the line.

History

Origin 
Like the Oahu Railway and Land Company (OR&L), the HCR grew out of a necessity for good transportation (in this case, mainly to serve sugarcane plantations) at the turn of the 20th century. Though not the first railroad on the Big Island, it was certainly the most ambitious. Its principal backer was Benjamin Dillingham, the businessman who also started the OR&L, among numerous other Hawaiian companies.

Dillingham incorporated the Hilo Railroad Company (HRC) with his partners Lorrin A. Thurston, Alfred Wellington Carter, and Mark P. Robinson; HRC received a charter on March 28, 1899 to build the original  of the Hilo Railroad that connected the Olaa sugar mill to Waiākea, soon to become the location of Hilo's deepwater port. Under the terms of the charter, HRC was granted the right to build rail lines anywhere on the island over the next fifty years, and HRC was free to use any government land to do so. The line to Olaa Sugar was laid with 60-pound rail using standard-gauge railway.

After rail service on the Olaa line began on June 18, 1900, work continued apace with a  extension to Kapoho, home of the Puna Sugar Company plantation, completed by March 1902. Immediately after that two branch lines were constructed, also to sugar plantations, and then the railroad was extended north into Hilo itself. A chiefly tourist line, branching from Olaa, was built in 1901, routed inland  up the mountain to Glenwood where visitors would then transfer to buses for the remaining  trip to the Volcano House near Kilauea Volcano.

Hāmākua Division and receivership 
At this point the Hilo Railroad's southern section was fairly complete, and with strong sugar-related traffic the company was financially healthy. However, the company's fortunes would change drastically when Dillingham and other company owners in 1907 petitioned the US Congress and Territory of Hawaii to build a breakwater and improve Hilo Bay's harbor; at the time, the harbor was not well-protected from seasonal storms and heavy seas. In exchange for those projects, HRC would extend its line north-northwest from Hilo up the rugged Hāmākua coast to service the northern sugarcane plantations. 

The  Hāmākua Division was an engineering marvel, including the construction of 3 tunnels and 35 large trestle bridges (22 wooden and 13 steel) across the mouths of valleys. The tremendous expense forced the company into receivership by 1914, and by 1916 it was sold in foreclosure proceedings. The company was reorganized as the Hawaii Consolidated Railway (HCR) in February 1916.

The first section, stretching  from Hilo to the Hakalau Mill, was constructed between 1908 and 1911.

Reorganization as Hawaii Consolidated Railway 
To extend its existing line from eastern Hilo through Hāmākua, HRC also had to construct steel bridges over the Wailoa and Wailuku Rivers. Because of their near sea-level elevation, they were also vulnerable to rough seas, and were destroyed and replaced in 1923 (Wailoa) and 1924 (Wailuku).

The Wailuku River bridge collapsed on March 31, 1923, shortly after one fully-loaded train had passed and just as another was approaching. In a separate incident, two passenger trains collided on the Maulua bridge on October 22, 1924; one train had stopped to disembark passengers, and the other had just emerged from the longest tunnel on the line. Passenger service over the Hāmākua line was provided by Hall-Scott motorcars pulling passenger trailers. In 1925, HCR ordered three railbuses from the White Motor Company to provide daily passenger service between Puna and Hilo, with a small turntable at Pahoa. Due to stiff competition from motor vehicles, the Glenwood extension was scaled back to Mountain View in 1926.

While the new Hāmākua line had been extremely expensive to build, and was costly to maintain, it was especially popular with tourists on HCR's Scenic Express service for ships calling at Hilo Harbor. Combined with regular passengers and traffic generated from the numerous sugar mills along the way, the HCR made great strides in paying down its debt. Increased revenue during World War II made the company more prosperous, and HCR was making a profit by the end of 1945.

Tsunami and closure 

Ironically, just as the HCR was finally emerging from its long-standing financial troubles, it was hit with a blow from which it never recovered. On the morning of April 1, 1946, a massive tsunami caused by an earthquake in the Aleutian Islands struck Hilo and the Hāmākua coast, devastating the city and instantly wiping out a number of railroad bridges. Shareholders in HCR had already voted in March 1946 to discontinue rail operations. Parts of the original Hilo Railway line southeast from Hilo to Ōlaa were taken over by the local sugarcane plantations, but those were soon abandoned for trucks after December 1948. 

HCR offered its entire right of way for the bridge-laden Hāmākua division without charge to the Territorial Government and county supervisors, who refused to accept it; HCR sold its entire railroad as scrap to Gilmore Steel & Supply Co. in San Francisco for $81,000.

One of the only remnants of the railway is the roundhouse built in 1921 in Hilo at coordinates , just north of Hoʻolulu Park; the roundhouse is listed as one of the most endangered historic sites in Hawaii. , five of the original steel trestle bridges built by HRC have been retained along the Belt Road, albeit with significant modifications under the "Seismic Wave Damage Rehabilitation Project" of 1950. These span:

 Kapue Stream (milepost 6.28)
 Pāheehee Stream (milepost 13.31)
 Umauma Stream (milepost 16.02)

In addition, some bridges were built using materials and foundations salvaged from the Hāmākua Division, including:
 Wailuku River (milepost 2.49, reused piers)
 Kolekole Stream (milepost 13.97, reused steel beams) 
 Hakalau Plantation Road (milepost 15.29, reused steel beams)

Information about this railway can be found at the Laupahoehoe Train Museum, located in the old station agent's house.

References

Further reading
Best, Gerald M. Railroads of Hawaii: Narrow and Standard Gauge Common Carriers. Golden West Books, 1978.
 Treiber, Gale E. Hawaiian Railway Album WWII Photographs, volume 2. The Railroad Press, 2005.

External links
 Laupahoehoe Train Museum
 
 
 
 

Defunct Hawaii railroads
Railway companies established in 1899
Railway companies disestablished in 1946
Transportation in Hawaii County, Hawaii
1899 establishments in Hawaii
1946 disestablishments in Hawaii
2 ft 6 in gauge railways in Hawaii
3 ft gauge railways in the United States